Yuna Kasai (葛西 優奈, Kasai Yūna; born February 4, 2004) is a Japanese Nordic combined skier and ski jumper. At the 2021 Nordic Combined World Cup, she won bronze in both mass start and individual Nordic combined.

Life 

Kasai was born on February 4, 2004, in Sapporo, Hokkaido, Japan. She joined the Sapporo Jump Shōnen Club. In March 2018, at the age of 14, she participated in the 96th Japan Ski Championship held in Nayoro, and finished fourth in Nordic combined/5 km, missing the bronze medal by 38 seconds. At the 97th Japan Ski Championship in 2019, she won her first national medal in Hakuba, Nagano Prefecture, after finishing second behind Ayane Miyazaki.

After graduating from Sapporo Nishino Middle School, she entered Tokai University Sapporo High School. At the 2020 Winter Youth Olympics in Lausanne, she finished sixth in individual ski jumping. At the 2021 Nordic Junior World Ski Championships held in Lahti, she finished fourth in individual Nordic combined. The same year at the Nordic Combined World Cup, she won bronze in mass start Nordic combined and also bronze in the individual category in Otepää.

In 2022, at the Nordic Combined World Cup, she placed fourth in both the individual and mass start category in Val di Fiemme.

Statistics

World Cup

Season standings

Continental Cup

Season standings

References 

Japanese female Nordic combined skiers
Sportspeople from Sapporo
2004 births
Living people
Ski jumpers at the 2020 Winter Youth Olympics
Competitors at the 2023 Winter World University Games
Medalists at the 2023 Winter World University Games
21st-century Japanese women
Universiade medalists in nordic combined
Universiade gold medalists for Japan
Universiade silver medalists for Japan